Stephen Tyrer (born ) is a former rugby league footballer who last played as a goal-kicking  or er for Widnes Vikings in the Betfred Championship.

Tyrer previously played for St Helens, where he began his career, the Salford Red Devils and Widnes Vikings in the Super League.

Background
Tyrer was born in St Helens, Merseyside, England.

Playing career

St Helens
In November 2006, Tyrer was promoted to train with the St. Helens first team squad. Tyrer made a big impact on the first team squad in 2007, making a try scoring home début against Bradford, his strong running and goal kicking ability cemented his place as one of the games brightest prospects. Having made a significant contribution in Saints early win over Batley in the Challenge Cup, Tyrer was given a place in the squad for the first final at the new Wembley, although he did not take part in the match, he did receive a competition winner's medal. Having played his first full season as number 24, Tyrer was given the number 22 jersey for the 2008 Super League season. He found his opportunities limited however in a strong Saints squad.

Widnes Vikings
He spent the final third of the 2008 season on loan at Widnes where he wore the number 3 jersey and scored over 100 points, including two second half tries and several conversions in his début against Salford.

Celtic Crusaders
After Widnes missed out on a place in the 2009 Super League competition, Tyrer parted with the club to pursue his top flight ambitions with Crusaders.

Salford City Reds
This was followed by another season on loan at Salford.

Widnes
In late 2010, Tyrer was released from his Saints contract and returned to Widnes where he hoped to win a long term contract before Widnes recently announced their return to Super League for the 2012 season.

Halifax
Tyrer did not win a contract at Widnes so he joined Halifax. He was one of a few Widnes players to join Halifax after not winning a Super League contract at Widnes.
Tyrer went on to score 2,000 points for Halifax and sits second in the clubs all time points scoring charts behind hall of famer Ronnie James.

Widnes Vikings (rejoined)
On 18 August 2020 it was announced that Tyrer was re-joining Widndes for the 2021 season.

References

External links
Halifax profile
St Helens profile
Saints Heritages Society profile
St Helens bolstered by Hargreaves
Saints Invest in Local Youth
St Helens 34-22 Bradford
Saints Ease To Karalius Cup Win
Feature: Tyrer reflects on career

1989 births
Living people
Crusaders Rugby League players
English rugby league players
Halifax R.L.F.C. players
Rugby league centres
Rugby league players from St Helens, Merseyside
Rugby league wingers
Salford Red Devils players
St Helens R.F.C. players
Widnes Vikings players